Paraivongius diversitarsis is a species of leaf beetle of Senegal, described by Maurice Pic in 1952.

References

Eumolpinae
Beetles of Africa
Beetles described in 1952
Taxa named by Maurice Pic
Insects of West Africa